Marsupites is an extinct genus of crinoids from the Santonian stage of the Late Cretaceous.

Biostratigraphic significance 
The International Commission on Stratigraphy (ICS) has assigned the extinction of Marsupites testudinarius as the defining biological marker for the start of the Campanian stage of the Late Cretaceous, 83.6 ± 0.2 million years ago.

Distribution 
Fossils of the genus have been found in:
 Lipnik, Poland
 Haslam Formation, British Columbia, Canada

References

Bibliography 

 
 
 Fossils (Smithsonian Handbooks) by David Ward (Page 173)

Uintacrinida
Prehistoric crinoid genera
Cretaceous echinoderms
Index fossils
Prehistoric echinoderms of Europe
 
Cretaceous echinoderms of North America
Cretaceous British Columbia
Paleontology in British Columbia
Fossils of Canada
Fossils of Poland